Elie Rous, or Ely Rous (11 September 1909 – 2 April 1987) was an English football manager, active primarily in France.

Rous led Racing Paris to the 1940 Coupe de France title, and was runner-up with Sète in 1942.

He later coached Nice in 1950, and Metz between 1951 and 1952.

References

1909 births
Year of death missing
English footballers
English football managers
FC Sète 34 managers
OGC Nice managers
FC Metz managers
Racing Club de France Football managers
English expatriate football managers
Expatriate football managers in France
English expatriate sportspeople in France
Association footballers not categorized by position